Clara Kathleen Barnett Rogers (January 14, 1844 – March 8, 1931), was an English-born American composer, singer, writer and music educator.

Early life and education
Rogers was born in Cheltenham, England, into a musical family.  Her grandfather, Robert Lindley, was a cellist; her father, John Barnett, was an opera composer and was the first music teacher his children had; her mother, Eliza, was a singer.  At the age of twelve, her family moved to Germany to further the musical education of the children.  Clara was denied acceptance to the Leipzig Conservatory, but that decision was changed in 1857 in view of her talent, making her the youngest student ever admitted.  Two of her siblings also attended the conservatory.  During this time, her father returned to England while her mother stayed with her children, a trend that continued throughout the early part of Rogers's career.

While at Leipzig, Rogers studied the piano, harmony, part writing, violin, cello, and voice.  Although composition classes were not open to women at the conservatory when she first attended, the administration made a composition class for girls in 1859, after hearing the string quartet Rogers had composed at the age of 13. Her classmate, Arthur Sullivan, copied orchestra parts for her, found players and arranged a performance of the piece.  Rogers spent three years at the Conservatory, graduating at sixteen with honors.

Career and later years
Rogers chose to pursue a vocal career and became an opera singer.  Using the pseudonym Clara Doria, she debuted in 1863 in Turin, Italy in a performance of Robert le diable by Giacomo Meyerbeer.  After touring in Italy and five years in London as a concert singer, she came to United States in 1871 as a member of the Parepa-Rosa Opera Company and spent another seven years as a singer with at least three different troupes.

Her singing career ended in 1878 when she married Henry Munroe Rogers, a lawyer living in Boston, Massachusetts.  In Boston, Rogers had many artistic friends, such as Amy Beach, Margaret Ruthven Lang, George Chadwick, Oliver Wendell Holmes Jr., Amy Lowell, and Henry Wadsworth Longfellow.  Longfellow wrote the poem “Stay at Home, My Heart, and Rest” especially for Rogers.  She held weekly musicales at her home and helped to promote the careers of her artistic friends.

During her marriage, Rogers took up teaching and composing, which she said was “a supreme delight – amounting at times almost to intoxication!”   By the early 1880s, she had begun publishing some of her songs with the Arthur P. Schmidt company.  In 1888, she helped found the Boston Manuscript Club and was invited to join the Manuscript Club of New York in 1895 by Amy Beach.  Although she had rejected a teaching position there in the past, Rogers joined the faculty of the New England Conservatory in 1902, where she taught voice and began to write on music. Her literary works (see below) include six books on diction and technique and three autobiographies.

She died in 1931 in Boston.  Her correspondences and manuscripts are kept at the Harvard University Library.

Musical output
Around 100 songs
Four piano works
Two String Quartets
Sonata for violin and piano
Sonata for cello and piano

Other publications
The Philosophy of Singing, published in 1893
My Voice and I, published in 1910
English Diction in Song and Speech, published in 1912
Memories of a Musical Career, published in 1919/1920
The Voice in Speech, published in 1915
Your Voice and You, published in 1925
Clearcut Speech in Song, published in 1927
The Story of Two Lives, published in 1932
Journal-Letters from the Orient, published in 1934

Discography
Women at an Exposition: Music Composed by Women and Performed at the 1893 World's Fair in Chicago.  Susanne Mentzer, mezzo-soprano; Sunny Joy Langton, soprano; Elaine Skorodin, violin; Kimberly Schmidt, piano.  Koch International Classics 3-7240-2H1, 1993.

References

Bibliography
Block, Adrienne Fried. “Women in American Music, 1800-1918.”  Women & Music: A History; ed. Karin Pendle. Bloomington: Indiana University Press, 2001; pp. 212–215.
Bomberger, E. Douglas.  “The Nineteenth Century.”  From Convent to Concert Hall.  Eds Sylvia Glickman and Martha Furman.  Westport: Greenwood, 2003; p. 172.
“Rogers, Clara Kathleen.” International Encyclopedia of Women Composers; ed. Aaron I. Cohen. 2 vols. New York: Books & Music, Inc., 1987.
Fox, Pamela.  “Rogers [née Barnett], Clara Kathleen [Doria, Clara].”  Grove Music Online; ed. L. Macy. (Accessed March 19, 2007),.
Radell, Judith & Delight Malitsky. “Clara Kathleen Rogers.”  Women Composers: Music Through the Ages; eds. Sylvia Glickman and Martha Furman Schleifer.  12 vols.  New York: G. K. Hall & Co., 1999.

External links
Books
Books by Clara Kathleen Rogers (at the Internet Archive)

 portrait of Rogers as Clara Doria(AlexanderStreet; North American Theatre Online)

1844 births
1931 deaths
American composers
American women composers
American opera singers
American women singers
American music educators
American women music educators
Classical musicians from Massachusetts
Musicians from Boston
People from Cheltenham
University of Music and Theatre Leipzig alumni